Svein Helling (31 July 1910 – 16 January 1978) was a Norwegian sports shooter. He competed in the trap event at the 1952 Summer Olympics.

References

1910 births
1978 deaths
Norwegian male sport shooters
Olympic shooters of Norway
Shooters at the 1952 Summer Olympics
Sportspeople from Drammen
20th-century Norwegian people